George Aguilar is a Mescalero Apache and Pascua Yaqui actor. He is best known for his roles as Cahuenga in Bagdad Café, Johnny Sassamon in The Scarlet Letter, Grandfather Stone in Dreamkeeper, Big Foot in Into the West, and Kaw Chief in Neverland.

Career
Aguilar is probably best known for his work on Bagdad Cafe (1987), The Scarlet Letter (1995) and the miniseries Neverland (2011).

Personal life

Aguilar has been married to French actress Josiane Balasko since 2003. They reside in the Paris area.

A son, also named George Aguilar, was a car mechanic and aspiring actor who with his father appeared in The Scarlet Letter (1995) and Into The West (2005); he died in 2008 at age 28.

Filmography

Notes

External links

Living people
American male actors
1950 births
Mescalero Apache people
Pascua Yaqui people
Native American male actors
Native American people from Michigan
People from Flint, Michigan
Actors from Michigan
20th-century Native Americans
21st-century Native Americans